The term Canyon Dam may refer to the following:

Dams
 Canyon Dam (Sri Lanka), a dam in Sri Lanka.
 Canyon Dam (California), a dam in the U.S. State of California.
 Canyon Dam (Texas), a dam in the U.S. State of Texas.

Places
 Canyondam, California, a community in the U.S. State of California.